The Jakarta–Bogor–Ciawi Toll Road (shortened to Jagorawi Toll Road) is the first toll road in Indonesia. Construction of the highway began in 1973, and it was officially opened on 9 March 1978.

The Jagorawi Toll Road links the capital city of Jakarta to the West Javanese cities of Bogor and Ciawi. It has a length of around  going north and southbound and is operated by Jasa Marga, a state-owned enterprise.

The toll road has achieved break-even point, making it the cheapest toll road in Indonesia based on price per kilometer.

History
In 1973, the Indonesian government began building the first highway linking the capital Jakarta with the city of Bogor.  When the road was still in its construction phase, it was not officially a toll road.  When the highway was nearly finished, the government began considering ways to execute the operation and maintenance of the highway autonomously, without burdening governmental financing.  For that purpose, the Labor Department suggested that the portion of the road between Jakarta and Bogor be changed to a toll road. Private investors, with government financing, established the semi-private corporation Jasa Marga to manage the highway on 1 March 1978.  The road was officially inaugurated in a ceremony on March 9, 1978 hosted by President Suharto.

In 2017, PT Jasa Marga issued securities backed by the toll revenues from Jagorawi.

Exits

Facilities 
The Jagorawi Toll Road is four lanes wide (in each direction) from Taman Mini to Citeurep, and three lanes wide from Citeurep to Bogor.

The toll road has a Pertamina gas station which is combined with restaurants, rest areas, and outlet stores.

Notable accidents
On 8 September 2013, the toll road has been a major point for an accident involving Ahmad Dhani and Maia Estianty's youngest son Dul, primarily on the KM 8+200 mark. 7 people were killed in the accident and 8 people were severely injured due to the crash. It was revealed that Dul lost control of his car and hit the metal separator while traveling home from Bogor to Jakarta, crashing into two oncoming vehicles.

Floods
For the first time in January 2014, Jagorawi Toll Road was flooded from Cipinang River at KM 4. The toll road was still operational in both directions, with vehicles driving slowly through the flood. Consequently, the toll road suffered from severe gridlock.

Ciawi–Sukabumi Toll Road

Ciawi–Sukabumi Toll Road is a planned 54-km extension of Jagorawi Toll Road, subdivided into 4 sections:
 Ciawi–Cigombong, 
 Cigombong–Cibadak, 
 Cibadak–West Sukabumi, 
 West Sukabumi–East Sukabumi, 
Concession is held by PT Trans Jabar Toll, a subsidiary of state-owned developer Waskita Karya. Land acquisition by January 2013 was at 40 percent, and Trans Jabar predicted that the construction would begin by the end of 2013. However, construction was delayed due to problems with land acquisition.  President Joko Widodo renewed the government's efforts to complete land acquisition in 2016.  The Ciawi–Cigombong section was opened in December 2018.  Construction on the second section, Cigombong–Cibadak, was 76.50% complete by February 2021; the projected completion date is August 2021.

References

External links 
 PT Jasa Marga (Persero) Tbk.
 Cabang Jagorawi PT Jasa Marga (Persero) Tbk.

Buildings and structures in Jakarta
Toll roads in Indonesia
Transport in Jakarta
Transport in West Java